Garzeno is a comune (municipality) in the Province of Como in the Italian region Lombardy, located about  north of Milan and about  northeast of Como.

Garzeno borders the following municipalities:   Cremia, Cusino, Dongo,  Grandola ed Uniti, Orta Nova, Pianello del Lario, Plesio, San Bartolomeo Val Cavargna, San Nazzaro Val Cavargna,

References

Cities and towns in Lombardy